Narendra Kumar Kushwaha (born 1 July 1967) is an Indian politician with the Bahujan Samaj Party (BSP). He stood for the 2004 Lok Sabha elections on the BSP ticket and was a Member of Parliament from Mirzapur.

References

1967 births
Living people
People from Mirzapur
India MPs 2004–2009
People from Sonbhadra district
Bahujan Samaj Party politicians from Uttar Pradesh
Lok Sabha members from Uttar Pradesh